Nashat Akram Abid Ali Al-Eissa (born 12 September 1984) is a former Iraqi professional footballer. Popularly dubbed "The Maestro" and "The Musician", Akram usually played as a playmaker or as an attacking midfielder and was known for his exceptional vision and excellent passing ability, as well as his ability to score goals from long range.

Akram was Iraq's most promising young prospect in the early 2000s, and became an integral part of the Iraq national team as he helped them win the 2007 AFC Asian Cup, winning the man of the match award in the final and being voted for the Team of the Tournament as well as finishing in third place in the AFC Footballer of the Year award in 2007. At Iraqi club level, he won the Iraqi Premier League title with Al-Shorta in 2012–13 as well as three Iraqi Elite Cup titles in 2000, 2001 and 2002.

He also won league titles with Saudi club Al-Shabab, Qatari club Al-Gharafa and Dutch club FC Twente. Akram almost signed for Premier League club Manchester City in 2008, but work permit issues meant that he was not allowed to join, while he was also linked with clubs such as Sunderland and Málaga in his career.

Biography 

Nashat Akram made his name as the star player in Iraq's U-17s managed by Ammo Baba, who finished second in their Asian Cup qualifying group. He was later called into the Iraq U-19s by Adnan Hamad. Against Pakistan, he was instrumental in the 6–0 demolition setting 2 goals in 6 minutes, the 2nd Nashat was involved in the beginning of a move on the Iraqi left, then he reappeared on the right-hand edge of the penalty area to put Emad Mohammed through with an exquisite back heel that took three defenders out of the play, leaving Emad free to score. He was a regular until he was replaced at half time against Korea Republic due to a tactical change, he later made appearances late on in games and created openings with his inspirational play. In the final Nashat's long ball forward caused confusion between Shohei Ikeda and his goalkeeper, which resulted in a weak clearing header by Fujigaya. The ball fell to Emad who hooked the ball over both players to score the winner.

While many footballers are admired for their footwork or dominance in the air, Nashat Akram impresses with his cunning. After steering Iraq to their maiden success at the AFC Asian Cup 2007 with his intelligent midfield prompting, the cool-headed playmaker instantly became a popular figure across the continent.

However, long before he made a name for himself at the senior level, Akram attracted attention across Asia when his creativity helped Iraq win the AFC Youth Championship 2000. That same year, the 17-year-old made it into the first team of Iraqi giants Al-Shorta. After a series of brilliant performances, which included helping the team to glory in the Umm Al-Marek Cup and reaching the Iraq FA Cup final in 2002, the midfield prodigy began to be heralded as one of Asia's most promising talents.

And it did not take Akram long to live up to these sizeable expectations. Though still a teenager, he was instrumental in Iraq's qualification for both the Asian Cup 2004 and the Olympic Football Tournament Athens 2004. His excellent vision and defence-piercing passes – skills rarely seen in players his age – captivated national coach Adnan Hamad, who appointed Akram captain, despite being one of the youngest players on the senior team.

Akram did not let his coach down and impressed throughout Iraq's campaign in the AFC Asian Cup 2004. He also revealed his goalscoring ability when he was on target in the 2–1 win over Saudi Arabia in the final group match, a result which sent them through to the last eight at the Saudis' expense.

It was not the first goal that he scored for the national team, nor has it been the last. He hit the mark again in Iraq's memorable 3–1 win over Australia in a group match in the AFC Asian Cup 2007, before slamming home to seal a 2–1 victory over hosts China in a qualifier for the 2010 FIFA World Cup South Africa.

Despite winning the continental title, Iraq's disappointing qualifying campaign for the 2010 FIFA World Cup has left Akram and his teammates with the feeling that they still have something to prove. After making his national team debut against Saudi Arabia in a qualifying match for the 2002 FIFA World Cup Korea/Japan, the 24-year-old also figured in Iraq's more recent qualifying campaigns, both times with little success. Iraq failed to progress to Asia's final round of qualifying for the 2006 FIFA World Cup Germany and they suffered a similar fate four years later when they failed to book their passage to South Africa.

Club career

Salahaddin 
Nashat Akram started his senior career at Salahaddin FC and made his debut in the 1999–2000 season under the coach Ammo Baba. He scored his first goal for Salahaddin in a 6–1 win over Al-Samawa in the 1999–2000 Iraq FA Cup on 3 January 2000.

Al-Shorta 
In 2000, at age of 16, Nashat Akram transferred to Al-Shorta and made it into their first team, and from the first sight the analysts believed that Iraq would produce one of the most promising players in Asia. In 2001, he was loaned out to Al-Zawraa for their matches in the Asian Club Championship. In 2002, he became a regular starter with his team leading them to win the Iraqi Elite Cup and reaching the Iraq FA Cup final; unfortunately for the young star, they finished 2nd. After his great performance with Al-Shorta, Nashat Akram was called up to the Iraq Youth Team and later nominated for Asian Young Footballer of the Year. Nashat's Al Shorta finished third on 2 of the 3 season he spent at the club, and were leading the league in his final season before it was cancelled due to war.

Al-Nassr 
In 2003, he signed for Al-Nassr after their newly appointed coach Yugoslav Ljubiša Tumbaković was in awe of Nashat's performance in the Emir Faisal Abdullah Friendship Cup in Abha in the 5–1 demolition of his side. Nashat has since seen three of his coaches at Al-Nassr replaced, Ljubiša Tumbaković, the Romanian Mircea Rednic, and the Egyptian Mohsen Saleh after less than a year at the club. He left the Saudi club due to wranglings over unpaid wages owed to him. Al Nassr finished 7th (out of 12) in his only season with the club.

Al-Shabab
In 2004, Nashat signed with the giant club Al-Shabab; in his first season, the team won the Saudi Premier League, and won the title again in 2006, where Akram also won the league's Player of the Year and Foreign Player of the Year awards.

Al-Ain and moving to England controversy
On 1 August 2007, Nashat Akram signed a 1-year contract with the club Al-Ain from UAE for 1 million dollars, he was also linked to England with Sunderland.
During the current transfer window (January 2008), Akram agreed a deal to sign for Sven-Göran Eriksson's Manchester City side following a successful trial spell. Described by the Swede as an "elegant footballer," Akram was however refused the necessary work permit due to Iraq's FIFA ranking being outside the world's top 70 at the time. After his unsucceful transfer move, Nashat returned to Al Ain and the team finished 6th (out of 12) in the league that season. Following that season he signed for Al-Gharafa on a free transfer.

Al-Gharafa
In April 2008, Nashat signed with the Qatari League champions Al-Gharafa for one season. He made his debut on 27. April against Al-Arabi Sports Club in the Qatar Crown Prince Cup. They won 4:3 and Nashat assisted two goals. He completed his achievement with Al-Gharafa when he won the Qatari League 2008–09 and 2009 Emir of Qatar Cup. Nashat scored 10 goals with Al-Gharafa.

Nashat Akram vs. Real Madrid
On 15 May 2008, although Nashat Akram signed for Al-Gharafa, Akram has received an invitation from Al-Nassr of Saudi Arabia to participate in a testimonial honoring club legend Majed Abdullah on 20 May against the Stars of Real Madrid CF. On 20 May 2008, Nashat Akram played with Al-Nassr against Real Madrid for 75 minutes, in the 53rd minute Nashat Akram assisted the first goal and scored the 2nd goal in the 55th minute. The match finished 4–1 for Al-Nassr.

FC Twente
On 19 May 2009, the Iraqi international midfielder signed a three-year contract with FC Twente in the Netherlands, he comes on a free transfer until 2012 and previously played for Qatari club Al-Gharafa. FC Twente won the Dutch league in 2009/10.

On 10 June 2010, Nashat was released and canceled his two-year contract remaining with Dutch champions FC Twente after having many difficulties with the club, such as an injury keeping him off the pitch for more than 8 weeks.

Al-Wakrah
In November 2010, Akram signed with Al-Wakrah on a free transfer for the remainder of the season. Al Wakrah finished 7th in the league (out of 12 teams). They were eliminated in the Quarter Final by Lekhwiya in the 2011 Emir of Qatar Cup. He Left Al Wakrah at the end of the season to sign for Qatari champions Lekhwiya

Lekhwiya
In July 2011, Akram signed with Lekhwiya, the league title holder in the Qatar Stars League. He had some problems which he later released him from his contract during the winter transfer window.

Al-Wakrah
On 3 January 2012, shortly after being released by Lekhwiya, Nashat signed with his former club Al-Wakrah. He joined alongside national teammates Younis Mahmoud, Alaa Abdul-Zahra, and Ali Rehema.
where he added the Qatari Stars Cup to his trophy tally after winning it in March, where he scored an 85th-minute winner against his former club Lekhwiya in the Semi Final. Al Wakrah once again finished 7th in the league with Nashat Akram.

Al-Nasr
At the beginning of the season, Nashat signed with Al-Nasr Dubai. On 24 September 2012 he won his first league game started in the UAE Pro-League against Al Jazira. On 29 September Nashat scored his first goal for the club in the UAE Pro-League against Al Wasl in a 2–2 draw, next fixture after that on 5 October Nashat scored in 4–2 win against Al Shabab then after that Al-Nasr won 6–1 against Ittihad Kalba with Nashat Akram on the score sheet. Nashat left the club in February to return to his home country of Iraq.

Al-Shorta

On 17 February 2013, Nashat signed a contract with his former club Al Shorta after 10 years abroad. He said that he wished to fulfill the dreams of Al Shorta's fans and win the Iraqi Premier League. He was given the number 15 shirt, formerly worn by Abbas Rehema who had just left to join Al-Talaba. Nashat scored on his first start for Al Shorta with a free-kick in a comfortable 3–0 win against Al-Sinaa. He went on to score against Al-Najaf FC, Erbil SC, Zakho FC, Karbalaa FC and in the Baghdad Derby against Al-Zawraa in his return season, captaining his side to their third Iraqi Premier League title. He also allowed Amjad Kalaf to be the first man to lift the trophy for Al Shorta, even though Nashat was the captain. The Maestro, as he is called by the Al Shorta supporters, continued to be a key player for the team as his side started the 2013–14 in an attempt to defend their title, scoring a goal against Al-Karkh SC before leaving the club.

Dalian Aerbin
On 11 February 2014, Nashat free transferred from Al-Shorta to the Chinese Super League, signing a 2-years contract with Dalian Aerbin. He made his debut with this team on 22 March against Henan Jianye in the Chinese Super League, playing the first half and being substituted in the 53 minute for Sun Bo. His debut match ended in a 2–2 draw between the two teams. Nashat played three matches with this team and then he stopped due to injury. Because of Injuries and Nashat failing to adjusting to the lifestyle in China he terminated his contract, but the matter was acrimonious and resulted in a case before the Court of Arbitration for Sport (CAS 2015/A/4039) which he lost and he was ordered to pay compensation to the Chinese club. He returned to Al Shorta.

Al-Shorta
On 17 August 2014, Nashat re-signed for Al-Shorta after his unsuccessful spell in China. The news of his arrival at the club excited supporters who hoped that he could replicate the form he showed in the 2012–13 season and help the club to win the league title again. However, after just two games at the club, Nashat left the club due to Ayad Bunyan (Nashat's father-in-law) being voted out from his position as president of the club. He became a free agent and said that he would only play for Al-Shorta if Ayad Bunyan was the president.

Erbil
In February 2015, Nashat signed a contract with Erbil SC, but only to play AFC Cup matches. He made his debut against FC Istiklol, coming on as a substitute in the 72nd minute and assisting Erbil's final goal in a 3–1 victory. He made another substitute appearance against Qadsia SC, coming on in the 71st minute of a 1–0 loss. He made his final appearance for the club in a 2–1 defeat to Ahal FK, starting the match before getting subbed off on 73 minutes while the scores were still levelled at 1–1.

Nashat announced his retirement in April 2015 after becoming a father.

International career

Youth team 
Nashat Akram made his name as the star player in Iraq's U-17s managed by Ammo Baba, who finished 2nd in their Asian Cup qualifiers group in July 2000. He was later called up by Adnan Hamad into the Iraq Under-19s. He was instrumental in the 6–0 demolition of Pakistan, setting up 2 goals in 6 minutes. He was a regular until he was replaced at half time against Korea Republic due to a tactical change; he later made appearances late on in games and created openings with his inspirational play. In part due to his efforts, Iraq won the AFC Youth Championship 2000 and qualified to the 2001 FIFA World Youth Championship in Argentina. Later he was nominated the Asian Young Footballer of the Year.

Iraq national team 
He made his international debut on 5 October 2001 in a World Cup qualification match against Saudi Arabia in Amman at the age of only 17 years and 23 days. On 15 June 2008 Nashat Akram scored a goal against China in China, to make an important 2 – 1 win for Iraq and gave a hope for qualifying to the next stage.

In the Asian World cup 2014 qualifiers, he provided a crucial assist to Younis Mahmoud against China. In the following game, he scored a double in Iraq's 3–1 victory over Jordan to allow Iraq to advance to the final round of the Asian World cup 2014 qualifiers, and he also score a penalty in Iraq's 7–1 triumph over Singapore helping his country to seal the top spot in the group. He scored again, in Iraq's opening match in the final round of Asian World cup 2014 qualifiers against Jordan, though the match ended in a 1–1 stalemate. In the Asian World cup 2014 qualifiers he went on to feature against Oman, Japan (albeit as a substitute), and against Australia. Before the match against Australia, he was part of Iraq's starting XI in their friendly match against Brazil.

Iraqi Olympic team 
After the 2003 war, even though he was one of the youngest players in the squad, he was named the Iraqi Olympic team captain by Adnan Hamad and impressed during the Emir Faisal Abdullah Friendship Cup in Abha, In 2004 Nashat Akram helped his team to qualify to the 2004 Olympic Games and he was part of the team in the finals, Iraq Olympic team reached the 4th place losing to Italy 0–1

The 2007 Asian Cup
Nashat Akram was a major factor in the team, his great vision and mentality helped the team to win the 2007 Asian Cup; Nashat Akram was part of almost all Iraq's goals in the Asian Cup. He scored the opening goal against the 3–1 victory over Australia in the 23rd minute, and also made the assist for the 2nd goal by Hawar, and was part of the third goal. Nashat Akram won the Most Valuable Player award in 2 matches, the first against Australia and the 2nd against Saudi Arabia in the final. In 2007 Nashat Akram was Asian Footballer of the Year 3rd place.

International goals
Scores and results list Iraq's goal tally first.

Honours

Club
 Al-Shorta
Iraqi Premier League: 2012–13
Iraqi Elite Cup: 2000, 2001, 2002

 Al-Shabab 
Saudi Professional League: 2005–06

 Al-Gharafa 
Qatar Stars League: 2008–09
Emir of Qatar Cup: 2009

 Twente 
Eredivisie: 2009–10

 Al-Wakrah 
Qatari Stars Cup: 2011–12

Country
AFC U-19 Championship: 2000
WAFF Championship: 2002
West Asian Games: 2005
AFC Asian Cup: 2007

Individual
 Best Foreign Player in the 2005–06 Saudi Premier League
 Most Valuable Player of the 2007 AFC Asian Cup Final
 Selected for the 2007 AFC Asian Cup All-Star XI
 Finished third place in the 2007 Asian Footballer of the Year award
 FIFA Midfielder of the Year in 2007
 Asian Player of the Year at the 2009 International Football Award
 Soccer Iraq Team of the Decade: 2010–2019

Personal life
Nashats parents are from Babil. Nashat is the second child after his oldest brother Haider Akram and before his youngest brother Hassan Akram. In the year 2009, Hassan was kidnapped by a terrorist group in Iraq but was freed by the Iraqi police. Nashat is married with Hawra Al-Nadawi, an Iraqi writer living in London and they have two children. His father died when he was a little child.

See also
 List of men's footballers with 100 or more international caps

References

External links
 
  
 Profile on Iraqsport
 Player's Forum

1984 births
Living people
People from Hillah
Iraqi footballers
Iraq international footballers
Iraqi expatriate footballers
Association football midfielders
Expatriate footballers in the Netherlands
Al-Wakrah SC players
Al-Gharafa SC players
Lekhwiya SC players
Al-Zawraa SC players
Al-Quwa Al-Jawiya players
Al Ain FC players
FC Twente players
Eredivisie players
Footballers at the 2004 Summer Olympics
Olympic footballers of Iraq
2004 AFC Asian Cup players
2007 AFC Asian Cup players
2009 FIFA Confederations Cup players
2011 AFC Asian Cup players
AFC Asian Cup-winning players
Qatar Stars League players
FIFA Century Club
Expatriate footballers in the United Arab Emirates
Al Nassr FC players
Al-Shabab FC (Riyadh) players
Al-Nasr SC (Dubai) players
Expatriate footballers in China
Dalian Professional F.C. players
Chinese Super League players
Erbil SC players
Al-Shorta SC players
Saudi Professional League players
Expatriate footballers in Saudi Arabia
Iraqi expatriate sportspeople in Saudi Arabia
UAE Pro League players
Iraq under-20 international footballers
Iraq youth international footballers